The 555 timer IC is an integrated circuit (chip) used in a variety of timer, delay, pulse generation, and oscillator applications.  Derivatives provide two (556) or four (558) timing circuits in one package. The design was first marketed in 1972 by Signetics.  Since then, numerous companies have made the original bipolar timers, as well as similar low-power CMOS timers.  In 2017, it was said that over a billion 555 timers are produced annually by some estimates, and that the design was "probably the most popular integrated circuit ever made".

History 

The timer IC was designed in 1971 by Hans Camenzind under contract to Signetics.  In 1968, he was hired by Signetics to develop a phase-locked loop (PLL) IC.  He designed an oscillator for PLLs such that the frequency did not depend on the power supply voltage or temperature.  Signetics subsequently laid off half of its employees due to the 1970 recession, and development on the PLL was thus frozen.  Camenzind proposed the development of a universal circuit based on the oscillator for PLLs and asked that he develop it alone, borrowing equipment from Signetics instead of having his pay cut in half. Camenzind's idea was originally rejected, since other engineers argued the product could be built from existing parts sold by the company; however, the marketing manager approved the idea.

The first design for the 555 was reviewed in the summer of 1971. After this design was tested and found to be without errors, Camenzind got the idea of using a direct resistance instead of a constant current source, finding that it worked satisfactorily. The design change decreased the required 9 external pins to 8, so the IC could be fit in an 8-pin package instead of a 14-pin package. This revised version passed a second design review, and the prototypes were completed in October 1971 as the NE555V (plastic DIP) and SE555T (metal TO-5).  The 9-pin version had already been released by another company founded by an engineer who had attended the first review and had retired from Signetics; that firm withdrew its version soon after the 555 was released. The 555 timer was manufactured by 12 companies in 1972, and it became a best-selling product. 

The 555 found many applications beyond timers. Camenzind noted in 1997 that "nine out of 10 of its applications were in areas and ways I had never contemplated. For months I was inundated by phone calls from engineers who had new ideas for using the device."

Name 
Several books report the name "555" derived from the three 5 kΩ resistors inside the chip. However, in a recorded interview with an online transistor museum curator, Hans Camenzind  said "It was just arbitrarily chosen. It was Art Fury (marketing manager) who thought the circuit was gonna sell big who picked the name '555'."

Design
Depending on the manufacturer, the standard 555 package incorporated the equivalent of 25 transistors, 2 diodes, and 15 resistors on a silicon chip packaged into an 8-pin dual in-line package (DIP-8). Variants available included the 556 (a DIP-14 combining two complete 555s on one chip), and 558 / 559 (both variants were a DIP-16 combining four reduced-functionality timers on one chip).

The NE555 parts were commercial temperature range, 0 °C to +70 °C, and the SE555 part number designated the military temperature range, −55 °C to +125 °C. These chips were available in both high-reliability metal can (T package) and inexpensive epoxy plastic (V package) form factors. Thus, the full part numbers were NE555V, NE555T, SE555V, and SE555T.

Low-power CMOS versions of the 555 are now available, such as the Intersil ICM7555 and Texas Instruments LMC555, TLC555, TLC551.

Internal schematic 
The internal block diagram and schematic of the 555 timer are highlighted with the same color across all three drawings to clarify how the chip is implemented:
 : Between the positive supply voltage VCC and the ground GND is a voltage divider consisting of three identical resistors (5kΩ for bipolar timers, 100kΩ or higher for CMOS) to create reference voltages for the comparators. CONTROL is connected between the upper two resistors, allowing an external voltage to control the reference voltages:
 When CONTROL is not driven, this divider creates an upper reference voltage of  VCC and a lower reference voltage of  VCC.
 When CONTROL is driven, the upper reference voltage will instead be VCONTROL and the lower reference voltage will be  VCONTROL.
 : The comparator's negative input is connected to voltage divider's upper reference voltage, and the comparator's positive input is connected to THRESHOLD.
 : The comparator's positive input is connected to voltage divider's lower reference, and the comparator's negative input is connected to TRIGGER.
 : An SR flip-flop stores the state of the timer and is controlled by the two comparators. RESET overrides the other two inputs, thus the flip-flop (and therefore the entire timer) can be reset at any time.
 : The output of the flip-flop is followed by an output stage with pushpull (P.P.) output drivers that can supply up to 200mA for bipolar timers, lower for CMOS timers.
 : Also, the output of the flip-flop turns on a transistor that connects DISCHARGE to the ground.

Pinout
The pinout of the 8-pin 555 timer and 14-pin 556 dual timer are shown in the following table.  Since the 556 is conceptually two 555 timers that share power pins, the pin numbers for each half are split across two columns.

In the following table, longer pin designations are used, because manufacturers never standardized the abbreviated pin names across all datasheets.

Modes 
The 555 IC has the following operating modes:
 Astable (free-running) mode – The 555 can operate as an electronic oscillator. Uses include LED and lamp flashers, pulse generation, logic clocks, tone generation, security alarms, pulse-position modulation, and so on. The 555 can be used as a simple ADC, converting an analog value to a pulse length (e.g., selecting a thermistor as timing resistor allows the use of the 555 in a temperature sensor with the period of the output pulse determined by the temperature). The use of a microprocessor-based circuit can then convert the pulse period to temperature, linearize it, and even provide calibration means.
 Monostable (one-shot) mode – In this mode, the 555 functions as a "one-shot" pulse generator. Applications include timers, missing pulse detection, bounce-free switches, touch switches, frequency dividers, capacitance measurement, pulse-width modulation (PWM), and so on.
 Bistable (flip-flop) mode – The 555 operates as an SR flip-flop. Uses include bounce-free latched switches.
 Schmitt trigger (inverter) mode – the 555 operates as a Schmitt trigger inverter gate which converts a noisy input into a clean digital output.

Astable 

In the astable configuration, the 555 timer puts out a continuous stream of rectangular pulses having a specific frequency. In this configuration, the control pin is not used, thus it is connected to ground through a 10 nF decoupling capacitor to shunt electrical noise. The threshold and trigger pins are connected to the capacitor ; thus they have the same voltage. 

Consequently, the trigger pin causes the output to go high and the internal discharge transistor to go to cut-off mode. The capacitor  starts charging until the voltage becomes  of the supply voltage. 

At that time, the threshold pin causes the output to go low and the internal discharge transistor to go into saturation mode. And the cycle repeats.

Consequently, the first pulse has a longer high time interval compared to later pulses. Moreover, the capacitor charges through both resistors but only discharges through , thus the output high interval is longer than the low interval. This is shown in the following equations:

The output high time interval of each pulse is given by:

 

The output low time interval of each pulse is given by:

 

Hence, the frequency  of the pulse is given by:

 

and the duty cycle  is given by:

 

Resistor  requirements:
 Particularly with bipolar 555 types, low values of  must be avoided so that the output stays saturated near zero volts during discharge, as assumed by the above equation. Otherwise, the output low time will be greater than calculated above.  

Shorter duty cycle 
To create an output high time shorter than the low time (i.e., a duty cycle less than 50%) a fast diode (i.e. 1N4148 signal diode) can be placed in parallel with R2, with the cathode on the capacitor side. This bypasses R2 during the high part of the cycle, so that the high interval depends only on R1 and C, with an adjustment based the voltage drop across the diode. The voltage drop across the diode slows charging on the capacitor, so that the high time is longer than the expected and often-cited ln(2)⋅R1C = 0.693 R1C. The low time will be the same as above, 0.693  R2C. With the bypass diode, the high time is:

 

As an extreme example, when VCC = 5 V, and Vdiode = 0.7 V, high time is 1.00 R1C, which is 45% longer than the "expected" 0.693 R1C. At the other extreme, when Vcc = 15 V, and Vdiode = 0.3 V, the high time is 0.725 R1C, which is closer to the expected 0.693 R1C. The equation reduces to the expected 0.693 R1C if Vdiode = 0 V.

Monostable 

In monostable mode, the output pulse ends when the voltage on the capacitor equals  of the supply voltage. The output pulse width can be lengthened or shortened to the need of the specific application by adjusting the values of R and C.

It is given by:

 

where  is the time in seconds,  is the resistance in ohms,  is the capacitance in farads,  is the natural log of 3 constant, which is 1.098612 (rounded to 6 significant digits), but it is commonly rounded to fewer digits in 555 timer books and datasheets, like 1.1 or 1.099.

While using the timer IC in monostable mode, the time span between any two triggering pulses must be greater than the RC time constant.

Examples 

Using the algebraic timing formula (above) and component values from the example table (right), time is calculated as follows:

 

when R is 91kΩ and C is 100nF

 

is converted into base units:  is natural log of 3,  is resistance in ohms,  is capacitance in farads,

 

is multiplied together

 

Using algebraic math, component values can be scaled by powers of 10 to get the same timing:
 10ms (−0.026%) = 10nF and 910kΩ 
 10ms (−0.026%) = 100nF and 91kΩ (values from table)
 10ms (−0.026%) = 1000nF and 9.1kΩ (1000nF is 1μF)

For each row in the example table (right), two additional timing values can easily be created by adding a second resistor in parallel or series.  In parallel, the new timing is half the table time. In series, the new timing is double the table time.
 5ms (−0.026%) = 100nF and 45.5kΩ (two 91kΩ resistors in parallel)
 10ms (−0.026%) = 100nF and 91kΩ (values from table)
 20ms (−0.026%)= 100nF and 182kΩ (two 91kΩ resistors in series)

Bistable 

In bistable mode, the 555 timer acts as an SR flip-flop. The trigger and reset inputs are held high via pull-up resistors while the threshold input is grounded. Thus configured, pulling the trigger momentarily to ground acts as a "set" and transitions the output pin to VCC (high state). Pulling the reset input to ground acts as a "reset" and transitions the output pin to ground (low state). No timing capacitors are required in a bistable configuration. The discharge pin is left unconnected or may be used as an open-collector output.

Schmitt trigger 

A 555 timer can be used to create a Schmitt trigger inverter gate which converts a noisy input into a clean digital output. The input signal should be connected through a series capacitor, which then connects to the trigger and threshold pins. A resistor divider, from VCC to GND, is connected to the previous tied pins. The reset pin is tied to VCC.

Packages

In 1972, Signetics originally released the 555 timer in DIP-8 and TO5-8 metal can packages, and the 556 timer was released in a DIP-14 package.

In 2006, the dual 556 timer was available in through-hole packages as DIP-14 (2.54 mm pitch), and surface-mount packages as SO-14 (1.27 mm pitch) and SSOP-14 (0.65 mm pitch).

In 2012, the 555 was available in through-hole packages as DIP-8 (2.54 mm pitch), and surface-mount packages as SO-8 (1.27 mm pitch), SSOP-8 / TSSOP-8 / VSSOP-8 (0.65 mm pitch), BGA (0.5 mm pitch).  

The MIC1555 is a CMOS 555-type timer with three fewer pins available in SOT23-5 (0.95 mm pitch) surface-mount package.

Specifications 

These specifications apply to the original bipolar NE555. Other 555 timers can have different specifications depending on the grade (industrial, military, medical, etc.).

Derivatives
Numerous companies have manufactured one or more variants of the 555, 556, 558 timers over the past decades, under many different part numbers.  The following is a partial list: 

 Table notes
 All information in the above table was pulled from references in the datasheet column, except where denoted below.
 For the "Total timers" column, a "*" denotes parts that are missing 555 timer features.
 For the "Iq" column, a 5-volt supply was chosen as a common voltage to make it easier to compare. The value for Signetics NE558 is an estimate because NE558 datasheets don't state Iq at 5 V. The value listed in this table was estimated by comparing the 5 V to 15 V ratio of other bipolar datasheets, then derating the 15 V parameter for the NE558 part, which is denoted by the "*".
 For the "Frequency max." column, a "*" denotes values that may not be the actual maximum frequency limit of the part. The MIC1555 datasheet discusses limitations from 1 to 5 MHz. Though most bipolar timers don't state the maximum frequency in their datasheets, they all have a maximum frequency limitation of hundreds of kHz across their full temperature range.  Section 8.1 of the Texas Instruments NE555 datasheet states a value of 100 kHz, and their website shows a value of 100 kHz in timer comparison tables. Signetics App Note 170 states that most devices will oscillate up to 1 MHz; however, when considering temperature stability, it should be limited to about 500 kHz. The application note from HFO mentions that at higher supply voltages the maximum power dissipation of the circuit might limit the operating frequency, as the supply current increases with frequency.
 For the "Manufacturer" column, the following associates historical 555 timer manufacturers to current company names.
 Fairchild Semiconductor was sold to ON Semiconductor in 2016.  ON Semiconductor was founded in 1999 as a spinoff of Motorola Semiconductor Components Group.  The MC1455 started as a Motorola product.
 Intersil was sold to Renesas Electronics in 2017.  The ICM7555 and ICM7556 started as Intersil products.
 Micrel was sold to Microchip Technology in 2015.  The MIC1555 started as a Micrel product.
 National Semiconductor was sold to Texas Instruments in 2011.  The LM555 and LM556 started as a National Semiconductor products.
 Signetics was sold to Philips Semiconductor in 1975, later to NXP Semiconductors in 2006.
 Zetex Semiconductors was sold to Diodes Incorporated in 2008.  The ZSCT1555 started as a Zetex product.

556 dual timer 

The dual version is called 556. It features two complete 555 timers in a 14-pin package; only the two power-supply pins are shared between the two timers. In 2020, the bipolar version was available as the NE556, and the CMOS versions were available as the Intersil ICM7556 and Texas Instruments TLC556 and TLC552. See derivatives table in this article.

558 quad timer 

The quad version is called 558 and has four reduced-functionality timers in a 16-pin package designed primarily for monostable multivibrator applications. By 2014, many versions of 16-pin NE558 have become obsolete.

Partial list of differences between 558 and 555 chips:
 One VCC and one GND, similar to 556 chip.
 Four "Reset" are tied together internally to one external pin (558).
 Four "Control Voltage" are tied together internally to one external pin (558).
 Four "Triggers" are falling-edge sensitive (558), instead of level sensitive (555).
 Two resistors in the voltage divider (558), instead of three resistors (555). 
 One comparator (558), instead of two comparators (555).
 Four "Output" are open-collector (O.C.) type (558), instead of push–pull (P.P.) type (555).

See also 
 RC circuit
 Counter (digital)
 Operational amplifier
 List of LM-series integrated circuits
 List of linear integrated circuits
 4000-series integrated circuits, List of 4000-series integrated circuits
 7400-series integrated circuits, List of 7400-series integrated circuits
 Push–pull output, Open-collector/drain output, Three-state output

References

Further reading 
Books
 (1978) (1st ed.)

  (1984) (1st ed.)
  (1977) (1st ed.)

 Books with timer chapters

 Datasheets
 See links in "Derivatives" table and "References" section in this article.

External links 

 Using the 555 Timer IC in Special or Unusual Circuits - Nuts & Volts magazine
 555 Timer Tutorial - Tony van Roon
 Common Mistakes When Using a 555 Timer
 Teardown of a bipolar RCA LM555CH chip
 Teardown of a CMOS TI LMC555 chip

Electronic oscillators
 Linear integrated circuits